The Basel Town Hall (German: Rathaus Basel, locally known as Roothuus) is a 500-year-old building dominating the Marktplatz in Basel, Switzerland.

The Town Hall houses the meetings of the Cantonal Parliament as well as the Cantonal Government of the canton of Basel-Stadt. 

The Great Council Chamber at one time featured a series of frescoes painted in 1522 by Hans Holbein the Younger, which have been lost. Fragments of the work as well as some of the initial drawings are kept in the Kunstmuseum.

"Rathaus" literally means "council house" while the term "Roothus" in the local Basel German dialect means both "council house" but also sounds like "red house", a pun with reference to the red sandstone facade of the building.

See also
 Politics of Switzerland

References

Basel Town Hall www.bs.ch

City and town halls in Switzerland
Buildings and structures in Basel